The Mao Adentro Formation is a geologic group in Dominican Republic. It preserves fossils dating back to the Neogene period.

See also

 List of fossiliferous stratigraphic units in Dominican Republic

References
 

Neogene Dominican Republic